Uzunlu is a village in the Kilis District, Kilis Province, Turkey. The village had a population of 303 in 2022.

References

Villages in Kilis District